Appias zarinda, the eastern orange albatross, is a butterfly of the family Pieridae that is found on Sulawesi and the Maluku Islands, Indonesia.

Subspecies and distribution
A. z. zarinda (Sulawesi, Kabaena, Tukangbesi Islands, and Peleng Island: Banggai Islands)
A. z. bouruensis (Wallace, 1867) (Buru)
A. z. phestus (Westwood, 1888) (Sangihe Islands and Talise Islands)
A. z. sulana (Fruhstorfer, 1899) (Mangole Island: Sula Islands)

References
 Vane-Wright, R.I. & R. de Jong (2003). The butterflies of Sulawesi: annotated checklist for a critical island fauna. Zoologische verhandelingen / uitgegeven door het Rijksmuseum van Natuurlijke Historie te Leiden 343, 11.vii.2003: 3-267.

Butterflies described in 1836
Appias (butterfly)
Butterflies of Indonesia
Taxa named by Jean Baptiste Boisduval